Let Well Alone is a 1954 detective novel by E.C.R. Lorac, the pen name of the British writer Edith Caroline Rivett. It is the fortieth in her long-running series featuring Chief Inspector MacDonald of Scotland Yard, one of the more orthodox detectives of the Golden Age of Detective Fiction.

Synopsis
Two young couples, tired of life in their drab London lodgings, are overjoyed when they hear that a property in isolated, rural Devon is available at a very cheap rent. However, not long after moving into the Old Court House, a body is discovered in one of the outbuildings and their new home instantly seems less idyllic. MacDonald, recently promoted to Superintendent, heads west to lead the investigation.

References

Bibliography
 Cooper, John & Pike, B.A. Artists in Crime: An Illustrated Survey of Crime Fiction First Edition Dustwrappers, 1920-1970. Scolar Press, 1995.
 Hubin, Allen J. Crime Fiction, 1749-1980: A Comprehensive Bibliography. Garland Publishing, 1984.
 Nichols, Victoria & Thompson, Susan. Silk Stalkings: More Women Write of Murder. Scarecrow Press, 1998.
 Reilly, John M. Twentieth Century Crime & Mystery Writers. Springer, 2015.

1954 British novels
British mystery novels
Novels by E.C.R. Lorac
Novels set in London
Novels set in Devon
British detective novels
Collins Crime Club books